Victoria Leigh Soto (November 4, 1985 – December 14, 2012) was an American teacher who was killed in the Sandy Hook Elementary School shooting. After the gunman, Adam Lanza entered the school, she hid her students; when the students later ran from their hiding places, she was reportedly shot four times by Lanza and died trying to shield them with her body. She has since been hailed as a hero. She is a posthumous recipient of the Presidential Citizens Medal.

Plans and petitions to honor her by name via scholarships, roads, and schools were announced in late 2012 and 2013. The Stratford Town Council unanimously approved a resolution to name a school after Soto, which opened in 2015, and the city of Bayamón, Puerto Rico, birthplace of Soto's father, is planning to name a public facility after her.

Biography 
Soto was born in Bridgeport, Connecticut, to Carlos Soto, a native of Bayamón, Puerto Rico, and Donna Fagan-Soto, of Irish-American descent. Her father worked for the Connecticut Department of Transportation as a crane operator and her mother was a nurse at Bridgeport Hospital. Her family moved to Stratford, Connecticut, and she graduated from Stratford High School in 2003. In 2008, she earned bachelor's degrees in both education and history at Eastern Connecticut State University. She then enrolled in graduate school at Southern Connecticut State University.

Death 
On December 14, 2012, Soto was teaching her first-grade class at Sandy Hook Elementary School, when Adam Lanza made his way into the school, and began to shoot staff and students. After killing fourteen students and two teachers in the first classroom, Lanza entered Soto's classroom. Media reports state that Soto had hidden several children in a closet, and when Lanza entered her classroom, Soto told him that the children were not there and that they were in the school gym. When several children ran from their hiding places, Lanza began shooting at the students. Soto was reportedly shot trying to shield them with her body. A photograph of Soto's sister awaiting news of her sister on her cell phone was taken by Associated Press photographer Jessica Hill and widely reproduced across the globe. Some news outlets labeled the photograph "iconic" and said that it has come to symbolize the tragedy.

Funeral 
A memorial service was held on December 15, and funeral services took place on December 19 at the Lordship Community Church. American musician and songwriter Paul Simon performed at the funeral services and sang "The Sound of Silence". On December 20, she was interred at Union Cemetery Stratford, Fairfield County, Connecticut. The Connecticut State Police honor guard saluted Soto's hearse en route.

Legacy 

In December 2012, Eastern Connecticut State University announced the creation of the Victoria Leigh Soto Endowed Memorial Scholarship Fund, awarded to students who aspire to become teachers. In December 2012, residents started a petition to rename North Parade in Stratford, Connecticut, to "Victoria Soto Way." On December 17, 2012, the Stratford High School Class of 2003 established the "Victoria L. Soto Memorial Fund" in her honor. The fund will use the donations made to help pay for the funeral services and for the creation of a memorial at Stratford High School and a scholarship fund in the name of Soto, a former classmate who belonged to the Class of 2003.

On January 14, 2013, the mayor of Stratford proposed the naming of a local school as the Victoria Soto Elementary School, with construction starting in 2013. The mayor's proposal was unanimously approved by the Stratford Town Council. The mayor also stated that a fund will be set up to accept donations from those who want to contribute to a memorial, which may include a statue of Soto.

In 2013, the Victoria Soto ACERO High School, located at W 51st Street, opened in Chicago, Illinois. It was designed by Wight & Co. The Victoria Soto ACERO High School is a public, charter school with grades ranging from kindergarten to the 12th grade.

The City of Bayamón, Puerto Rico is planning to name a public facility after Soto, whose paternal family was originally from Puerto Rico's second-most populous city.

On February 15, 2013, Soto and the other five adult teachers and administrators who were killed were posthumously awarded the Presidential Citizens Medal. The medal honors Americans who have performed "exemplary deeds of service" for their country or fellow citizens. The medal is commonly recognized as the government's second-highest civilian award and was presented to the families of the victims by President Barack Obama at a White House ceremony.

The Nutmeg Big Brothers Big Sisters organization created the "Victoria Soto Volunteer Award" in honor of Soto, who was a former Nutmeg mentor. On April 25, 2013, Ana Robles, a Nutmeg mentor, became the first recipient of the award. In June 2013, a playground in Long Brook Park in Stratford was named the "Victoria Soto Memorial Playground" in her honor.

In 2015, the Victoria Soto School was inaugurated and opened, with a ribbon-cutting ceremony, in Stratford, where she attended high school. The school, which was named in her honor, serves students from pre-kindergarten through second grade.

See also 

 List of Irish Americans
 List of Puerto Ricans
 List of Puerto Rican Presidential Citizens Medal recipients

References

External links 
Victoria Leigh Soto on Find A Grave

1985 births
2012 deaths
American murder victims
American people of Irish descent
American people of Puerto Rican descent
Schoolteachers from Connecticut
21st-century American women educators
People from Bridgeport, Connecticut
Presidential Citizens Medal recipients
Burials in Connecticut
Southern Connecticut State University alumni
Eastern Connecticut State University alumni
Deaths by firearm in Connecticut
People from Stratford, Connecticut
People murdered in Connecticut
21st-century American educators
Assassinated American people
Assassinated educators
Hispanic and Latino American teachers
Sandy Hook Elementary School shooting